This is a list of members of the 6th Bundestag – the lower house of parliament of the Federal Republic of Germany, whose members were in office from 1969 until 1972.



Summary 
This summary includes changes in the numbers of the three caucuses (CDU/CSU, SPD, FDP):

Members

A 
 Manfred Abelein, CDU
 Ernst Achenbach, FDP
 Rudi Adams, SPD
 Eduard Adorno, CDU (until 21 August 1972)
 Karl Ahrens, SPD
 Heinrich Aigner, CSU
 Siegbert Alber, CDU
 Odal von Alten-Nordheim, CDU
 Walter Althammer, CSU
 Franz Amrehn, CDU
 Jürgen Anbuhl, SPD (from 3 November 1970)
 Hans Apel, SPD
 Walter Arendt, SPD
 Claus Arndt, SPD
 Klaus Dieter Arndt, SPD
 Gottfried Arnold, CDU
 Helmut Artzinger, CDU

B 
 Herbert Baack, SPD
 Franz Josef Bach, CDU
 Hans-Joachim Baeuchle, SPD
 Fritz Baier, CDU
 Bernhard Balkenhol, CDU
 Hans Bals, SPD
 Hermann Barche, SPD
 Hans Bardens, SPD
 Willy Bartsch, SPD
 Rainer Barzel, CDU
 Hans Batz, SPD
 Hannsheinz Bauer, SPD
 Willi Bäuerle, SPD
 Hans Bay, SPD
 Alfons Bayerl, SPD
 Walter Becher, CSU
 Karl Bechert, SPD
 Curt Becker, CDU
 Helmuth Becker, SPD
 Josef Becker, CDU
 Friedrich Beermann, SPD
 Walter Behrendt, SPD
 Ernst Benda, CDU (until 8 December 1971)
 August Berberich, CDU
 Franz Berding, CDU
 Lieselotte Berger, CDU (from 26 August 1971)
 Urich Berger, CDU
 Karl Bergmann, SPD
 Karl Wilhelm Berkhan, SPD
 August Berlin, SPD
 Karl Bewerunge, CDU
 Hermann Biechele, CDU
 Alfred Biehle, CSU
 Günter Biermann, SPD
 Kurt Birrenbach, CDU
 Philipp von Bismarck, CDU
 Otto Bittelmann, CDU
 Theodor Blank, CDU (until 21 April 1972)
 Erik Blumenfeld, CDU
 Helmut von Bockelberg, CDU
 Fritz Böhm, SPD
 Günter Böhme, CDU
 William Borm, FDP
 Holger Börner, SPD
 Lenelotte von Bothmer, SPD
 Hans-Ulrich Brand, SPD (until 3 November 1970)
 Bruno Brandes, CDU (until 29 October 1969)
 Hugo Brandt, SPD
 Willy Brandt, SPD
 Aenne Brauksiepe, CDU
 Wenzel Bredl, SPD
 Ferdinand Breidbach, CDU
 Rolf Bremer, CDU
 Klaus Bremm, CDU
 Valentin Brück, CDU (from 14 August 1970)
 Alwin Brück, SPD
 Eberhard Brünen, SPD
 Hans Büchler, SPD (from 9 December 1971)
 Peter Büchner, SPD (from 12 October 1971)
 Werner Buchstaller, SPD
 Reinhard Bühling, SPD
 Andreas von Bülow, SPD
 Fritz Burgbacher, CDU
 Alfred Burgemeister, CDU (until 23 April 1970)
 Albert Burger, CDU
 Hermann Buschfort, SPD
 Bernhard Bußmann, SPD

C 
 Roland Cantzler, CSU (from 7 June 1972)
 Hugo Collet, SPD
 Peter Corterier, SPD
 Johann Cramer, SPD
 Herbert Czaja, CDU

D 
 Ralf Dahrendorf, FDP (until 25 August 1970)
 Carl Damm, CDU
 Valentin Dasch, CSU (until 15 September 1972)
 Rembert van Delden, CDU
 Hans Dichgans, CDU
 Emmy Diemer-Nicolaus, FDP
 Stefan Dittrich, CSU
 Friedhelm Dohmann, SPD (until 20 February 1970)
 Klaus von Dohnanyi, SPD
 Werner Dollinger, CSU
 Wolfram Dorn, FDP
 Heinrich Draeger, CDU
 Wilhelm Dröscher, SPD (until 12 October 1971)
 Ulrich Dübber, SPD (from 16 July 1971)
 Hermann Dürr, SPD

E 
 Felix von Eckardt, CDU
 Günther Eckerland, SPD
 Horst Ehmke, SPD
 Georg Ehnes, CSU (until 19 September 1972)
 Elfriede Eilers, SPD
 Ilse Elsner, SPD (until 14 May 1970)
 Wendelin Enders, SPD
 Matthias Engelsberger, CSU
 Björn Engholm, SPD
 Erhard Eppler, SPD
 Benno Erhard, CDU
 Ludwig Erhard, CDU
 Leo Ernesti, CDU
 Ferdinand Erpenbeck, CDU
 Josef Ertl, FDP
 Helmut Esters, SPD
 Hans Evers, CDU
 Heinz Eyrich, CDU

F 
 Walter Faller, SPD
 Friedhelm Farthmann, SPD (from 26 June 1971)
 Ludwig FellerMayer, SPD
 Udo Fiebig, SPD
 Otto Freiherr von Fircks, CDU
 Willi Fischer, SPD
 Gerhard Flämig, SPD
 Katharina Focke, SPD
 Erwin Folger, SPD
 Egon Franke, SPD
 Heinrich Franke, CDU
 Ludwig Franz, CSU
 Heinz Frehsee, SPD
 Friedrich Freiwald, CDU
 Göke Frerichs, CDU
 Brigitte Freyh, SPD
 Walter Fritsch, SPD
 Isidor Früh, CDU
 Karl Fuchs, CSU
 Liselotte Funcke, FDP
 Hans Furler, CDU

G 
 Georg Gallus, FDP (from 10 September 1970)
 Karl Gatzen, CDU
 Hans Geiger, SPD
 Ingeborg Geisendörfer, CSU
 Franz Xaver Geisenhofer, CSU
 Karl Geldner, FDP (from 26 January 1970)
 Hans-Dietrich Genscher, FDP
 Horst Gerlach, SPD
 Paul Gerlach, CSU
 Hans Gertzen, SPD
 Manfred Geßner, SPD
 Heinrich Gewandt, CDU
 Karl Heinz Gierenstein, CSU
 Udo Giulini, CDU
 Franz Gleissner, CSU
 Eugen Glombig, SPD
 Hermann Glüsing, CDU
 Fritz-Joachim Gnädinger, SPD
 Georg Gölter, CDU
 Leo Gottesleben, CDU
 Hermann Götz, CDU
 Carlo Graaff, FDP
 Johann Baptist Gradl, CDU
 Annemarie Griesinger, CDU (until 6 September 1972)
 Claus Grobecker, SPD (from 8 January 1970)
 Herbert Gruhl, CDU
 Martin Grüner, FDP
 Kurt Gscheidle, SPD (until 7 November 1969)
 Karl Theodor Freiherr von und zu Guttenberg, CSU (until 6 June 1972)

H 
 Dieter Haack, SPD
 Hermann Haage, SPD (until 21 December 1970)
 Ernst Haar, SPD
 Albrecht Haas, FDP (until 20 January 1970)
 Detlef Haase, SPD
 Lothar Haase, CDU
 Karl Haehser, SPD
 Hansjörg Häfele, CDU
 Friedhelm Halfmeier, SPD
 Walter Hallstein, CDU
 Hugo Hammans, CDU
 Karl-Heinz Hansen, SPD
 Hermann Hansing, SPD
 August Hanz, CDU
 Heinz Hartnack, CDU (from 14 September 1972)
 Kurt Härzschel, CDU
 Kai-Uwe von Hassel, CDU
 Rudolf Hauck, SPD
 Volker Hauff, SPD
 Alo Hauser, CDU
 Hugo Hauser, CDU
 Erwin Häussler, CDU
 Bruno Heck, CDU
 Udo Hein, SPD (until 19 January 1971)
 Alfred Hein, CDU (from 27 April 1970 until 18 April 1971)
 Walther Hellige, CDU (from 19 April 1971)
 Wilhelm Helms, CDU
 Erich Henke, SPD
 Maria Henze, CDU (until 10 April 1972)
 Luise Herklotz, SPD
 Herbert Hermesdorf, CDU
 Hans Hermsdorf, SPD
 Karl Herold, SPD
 Roelf Heyen, SPD
 Martin Hirsch, SPD (until 8 December 1971)
 Hermann Höcherl, CSU
 Karl Hofmann, SPD
 Egon Höhmann, SPD
 Hans Hörmann, SPD
 Erwin Horn, SPD
 Martin Horstmeier, CDU
 Alphons Horten, CDU
 Alex Hösl, CSU
 Antje Huber, SPD
 Hans Hubrig, CDU
 Herbert Hupka, CDU
 Dieter Hussing, CDU
 Lambert Huys, CDU

J 
 Werner Jacobi, SPD (until 5 March 1970)
 Maria Jacobi, CDU
 Richard Jaeger, CSU
 Hans Edgar Jahn, CDU
 Gerhard Jahn, SPD
 Günter Jaschke, SPD
 Philipp Jenninger, CDU
 Dionys Jobst, CSU
 Johann Peter Josten, CDU
 Kurt Jung, FDP
 Hans-Jürgen Junghans, SPD
 Gerhard Jungmann, CDU
 Heinrich Junker, SPD

K 
 Rudolf Kaffka, SPD
 Georg Kahn-Ackermann, SPD (from 28 December 1970)
 Margot Kalinke, CDU
 Helmut Kater, SPD
 Hans Katzer, CDU
 Friedrich Kempfler, CSU
 Karl-Hans Kern, SPD
 Ignaz Kiechle, CSU
 Gerhard Kienbaum, FDP (until 2 May 1972)
 Walther Leisler Kiep, CDU
 Kurt Georg Kiesinger, CDU
 Arthur Killat, SPD
 Victor Kirst, FDP
 Marie-Elisabeth Klee, CDU
 Detlef Kleinert, FDP
 Egon Klepsch, CDU
 Gisbert Kley, CSU
 Georg Kliesing, CDU
 Hans-Jürgen Klinker, CDU
 Gerhard Koch, SPD
 Peter-Michael Koenig, SPD
 Richard Kohlberger, SPD
 Klaus Konrad, SPD
 Heinrich Köppler, CDU (until 8 August 1970)
 Gottfried Köster, CDU
 Georg Kotowski, CDU
 Lothar Krall, FDP (from 16 March 1970)
 Karl Krammig, CDU
 Wilhelm Krampe, CDU
 Edith Krappe, SPD
 Konrad Kraske, CDU
 Reinhold Kreile, CSU
 Heinz Kreutzmann, SPD
 Herbert Kriedemann, SPD
 Horst Krockert, SPD
 Edeltraud Kuchtner, CSU
 Knut von Kühlmann-Stumm, FDP (until 30 May 1972)
 Alwin Kulawig, SPD
 Gerhard Kunz, CDU (from 13 December 1971)

L 
 Egon Lampersbach, CDU
 Erwin Lange, SPD
 Walter Langebeck, SPD
 Lauritz Lauritzen, SPD
 Hans Lautenschlager, SPD
 Ellen Lauterbach, SPD
 Georg Leber, SPD
 Albert Leicht, CDU
 Ernst Lemmer, CDU (until 18 August 1970)
 Karl Heinz Lemmrich, CSU
 Hans Lemp, SPD
 Hubert Lemper, SPD
 Helmut Lenders, SPD
 Eduard Lensing, CDU
 Carl Otto Lenz, CDU
 Franz Lenze, CDU
 Christian Lenzer, CDU
 Karl Liedtke, SPD
 Harry Liehr, SPD (until 16 July 1971)
 Helmut Link, CDU
 Josef Löbbert, SPD
 Lothar Löffler, SPD
 Fritz Logemann, FDP
 Paul Löher, CDU (from 23 April 1972)
 Ulrich Lohmar, SPD
 Walter Löhr, CDU
 Uwe Looft, CDU (from 15 October 1971)
 Rudi Lotze, SPD (until 17 October 1971)
 Paul Lücke, CDU
 Hans August Lücker, CSU
 Manfred Luda, CDU

M 
 Ernst Majonica, CDU
 Werner Marquardt, SPD
 Berthold Martin, CDU
 Franz Marx, SPD
 Werner Marx, CDU
 Kurt Matthes, SPD
 Hans Matthöfer, SPD
 Kurt Mattick, SPD
 Eugen Maucher, CDU
 Wilhelm Maybaum, SPD
 Hedwig Meermann, SPD
 Rolf Meinecke, SPD
 Erich Meinike, SPD
 Siegfried Meister, CDU
 Linus Memmel, CSU
 Erich Mende, CDU
 Alexander Menne, FDP (from 31 May 1972)
 Otto Menth, CSU (from 19 September 1972)
 Werner Mertes, FDP
 Günther Metzger, SPD
 Wilhelm Michels, SPD
 Josef Mick, CDU
 Paul Mikat, CDU
 Karl Miltner, CDU
 Wolfgang Mischnick, FDP
 Karl Moersch, FDP
 Helmuth Möhring, SPD
 Alex Möller, SPD
 Günther Müller, CDU
 Adolf Müller, CDU
 Heinrich Müller, SPD
 Johannes Müller, CDU
 Josef Müller, CDU
 Rudolf Müller, CDU
 Willi Müller, SPD
 Adolf Müller-Emmert, SPD
 Ernst Müller-Hermann, CDU
 Karl-Heinz Mursch, CDU
 Hans Müthling, SPD

N 
 Georg Neemann, SPD
 Paul Neumann, SPD
 Lorenz Niegel, CSU
 Wilhelm Nölling, SPD
 Günter von Nordenskjöld, CDU

O 
 Hermann Oetting, SPD (from 19 October 1971)
 Rainer Offergeld, SPD
 Alfred Ollesch, FDP
 Rudolf Opitz, FDP (from 2 May 1972)
 Gerhard Orgaß, CDU
 Elisabeth Orth, SPD
 Wilderich Freiherr Ostman von der Leye, SPD
 Anton Ott, CSU

P 
 Alfons Pawelczyk, SPD
 Willi Peiter, SPD
 Heinz Pensky, SPD
 Georg Peters, SPD
 Walter Peters, FDP
 Peter Petersen, CDU
 Anton Pfeifer, CDU
 Walter Picard, CDU
 Elmar Pieroth, CDU
 Liselotte Pieser, CDU
 Winfried Pinger, CDU
 Wolfgang Pohle, CSU (until 27 August 1971)
 Heinz Pöhler, SPD
 Eberhard Pohlmann, CDU (from 4 November 1969)
 Konrad Porzner, SPD
 Helmut Prassler, CDU
 Ludwig Preiß, CDU
 Albert Probst, CSU
 Herbert Prochazka, CSU (from 18 September 1972)

R 
 Joachim Raffert, SPD
 Alois Rainer, CSU
 Will Rasner, CDU (until 15 October 1971)
 Karl Ravens, SPD
 Wilhelm Rawe, CDU
 Gerhard Reddemann, CDU
 Carl Reinhard, CDU
 Gerhard Reischl, SPD
 Annemarie Renger, SPD
 Hans Richarts, CDU
 Klaus Richter, SPD
 Clemens Riedel, CDU
 Erich Riedl, CSU
 Fritz Rinderspacher, SPD
 Günter Rinsche, CDU
 Gerd Ritgen, CDU
 Burkhard Ritz, CDU
 Edelhard Rock, CDU
 Helmut Rohde, SPD
 Paul Röhner, CSU
 Dietrich Rollmann, CDU
 Josef Rommerskirchen, CDU
 Günter Schlichting-von Rönn, CDU (from 17 April 1972)
 Philip Rosenthal, SPD
 Hans Roser, CSU
 Josef Rösing, CDU
 Kurt Ross, SPD
 Thomas Ruf, CDU
 Hermann Josef Russe, CDU
 Wolfgang Rutschke, FDP (until 7 January 1971)

S 
 Peter Säckl, SPD (from 10 November 1969)
 Engelbert Sander, SPD
 Franz Sauter, CDU (from 29 August 1972)
 Karl-Heinz Saxowski, SPD
 Botho Prinz zu Sayn-Wittgenstein-Hohenstein, CDU
 Hans Georg Schachtschabel, SPD
 Friedrich Schäfer, SPD
 Marta Schanzenbach, SPD
 Albert Schedl, CSU (from 7 January 1971)
 Walter Scheel, FDP
 Ernst Schellenberg, SPD
 Adolf Scheu, SPD
 Christoph Schiller, SPD
 Karl Schiller, SPD
 Hildegard Schimschok, SPD
 Friedel Schirmer, SPD
 Georg Schlaga, SPD
 Albrecht Schlee, CSU
 Marie Schlei, SPD
 Carlo Schmid, SPD
 Klaus Schmid-Burgk, CDU
 Horst Schmidt, SPD (until 3 November 1969)
 , SPD
 Hansheinrich Schmidt, FDP
 Helmut Schmidt, SPD
 Hermann Schmidt, SPD
 Manfred Schmidt, SPD
 Martin Schmidt, SPD
 Otto Schmidt, CDU
 Walter Schmidt, SPD
 Wolfgang Schmidt, SPD
 Josef Schmitt, CDU
 Hermann Schmitt-Vockenhausen, SPD
 Karl-Heinz Schmitz, CDU (from 20 August 1970 until 25 August 1971)
 Kurt Schmücker, CDU
 Jürgen Schmude, SPD
 Herbert Schneider, CDU
 Oscar Schneider, CSU
 Kurt Schober, CDU
 Erwin Schoettle, SPD
 Wolfgang Schollmeyer, SPD
 Friedrich Schonhofen, SPD
 Heinrich Schröder, CDU (until 12 September 1972)
 Diedrich Schröder, CDU
 Gerhard Schröder, CDU
 Christa Schroeder, CDU
 Georg Schulhoff, CDU
 Dieter Schulte, CDU
 Manfred Schulte, SPD
 Fritz-Rudolf Schultz, FDP (until 11 March 1970)
 Klaus-Peter Schulz, CDU
 Max Schulze-Vorberg, CSU
 Wolfgang Schwabe, SPD
 Hermann Schwörer, CDU
 Horst Seefeld, SPD
 Philipp Seibert, SPD
 Max Seidel, SPD
 Hans Stefan Seifriz, SPD (until 6 January 1970)
 Rudolf Seiters, CDU
 Elfriede Seppi, SPD
 Franz Seume, CDU
 Hellmut Sieglerschmidt, SPD
 J Hermann Siemer, CDU
 Paul Heinrich Simon, SPD
 Günter Slotta, SPD
 Emil Solke, CDU
 Dietrich Sperling, SPD
 Karl-Heinz Spilker, CSU
 Hermann Spillecke, SPD
 Kurt Spitzmüller, FDP (from 12 January 1971)
 Gerd Springorum, CDU
 Rudolf Sprung, CDU
 Werner Staak, SPD (from 21 May 1970)
 Hermann Stahlberg, CDU
 Anton Stark, CDU
 Heinz Starke, CDU
 German Otto Stehle, CDU (from 7 September 1972)
 Gustav Stein, CDU
 Julius Steiner, CDU
 Gerhard Stoltenberg, CDU (until 3 June 1971)
 Maria Stommel, CDU
 Friedrich-Karl Storm, CDU
 Franz Josef Strauß, CSU
 Käte Strobel, SPD
 Alois Strohmayr, SPD
 Detlef Struve, CDU
 Richard Stücklen, CSU
 Walter Suck, SPD
 Egon Susset, CDU

T 
 Harry Tallert, SPD
 Richard Tamblé, SPD
 Franz-Lorenz von Thadden, CDU
 Helga Timm, SPD
 Peter Tobaben, CDU
 Albert Tönjes, SPD
 Irma Tübler, CDU

U 
 Franz Xaver Unertl, CSU (until 31 December 1970)
 Hermann Josef Unland, CDU
 Hans-Eberhard Urbaniak, SPD (from 9 March 1970)

V 
 Franz Varelmann, CDU
 Max Vehar, CDU
 Franz Vit, SPD
 Friedrich Vogel, CDU
 Wolfgang Vogt, CDU
 Günter Volmer, CDU

W 
 Carl-Ludwig Wagner, CDU
 Leo Wagner, CSU
 Karl-Heinz Walkhoff, SPD
 Hanna Walz, CDU
 Jürgen Warnke, CSU
 Kurt Wawrzik, CDU
 Hubert Weber, SPD
 Karl Weber, CDU
 Herbert Wehner, SPD
 Franz Weigl, CSU
 Richard von Weizsäcker, CDU
 Heinrich Welslau, SPD (from 26 February 1970)
 Manfred Wende, SPD
 Helmut Wendelborn, CDU (from 11 June 1971)
 Martin Wendt, SPD
 Rudolf Werner, CDU
 Heinz Westphal, SPD
 Günter Wichert, SPD
 Bruno Wiefel, SPD
 Karl Wienand, SPD
 Werner Wilhelm, SPD
 Heinrich Windelen, CDU
 Bernhard Winkelheide, CDU
 Hans-Jürgen Wischnewski, SPD
 Hans Wissebach, CDU
 Hans de With, SPD
 Fritz Wittmann, CSU (from 6 September 1971)
 Otto Wittmann, SPD
 Jürgen Wohlrabe, CDU
 Erika Wolf, CDU
 Willi Wolf, SPD
 Erich Wolfram, SPD
 Manfred Wörner, CDU
 Olaf Baron von Wrangel, CDU
 Lothar Wrede, SPD
 Otto Wulff, CDU
 Richard Wurbs, FDP
 Peter Würtz, SPD
 Kurt Wüster, SPD
 Günther Wuttke, SPD
 Johann Wuwer, SPD

Z 
 Fred Zander, SPD (from 3 November 1969)
 Franz Josef Zebisch, SPD
 Erich Ziegler, CSU
 Friedrich Zimmermann, CSU
 Otto Zink, CDU
 Siegfried Zoglmann, CDU

See also 
 Politics of Germany
 List of Bundestag Members

06